Pennsylvania House of Representatives District 7 is in western Pennsylvania and has been represented by Parke Wentling since 2023.

District profile
The 7th Pennsylvania House of Representatives District is located in Mercer County and includes the following areas:

 Clark
 Farrell
Greene Township
 Greenville
Hempfield Township
 Hermitage
Jamestwon
Lackawannock Township
Pymatuning Township
 Sharon
Sharpsville
Shenango Township
South Pymatuning Township
West Middlesex
West Salem Township
Wheatland

Representatives

Recent election results

References

External links

Pennsylvania House Legislative District Maps from the Pennsylvania Redistricting Commission.
 from the Pennsylvania Redistricting Commission.

Government of Mercer County, Pennsylvania
7